Deno (also known as Denawa, Denwa, Be) is an Afro-Asiatic language spoken in Nigeria. Speakers are shifting to Hausa and Fulfulde.

Notes 

West Chadic languages
Languages of Nigeria